Bolshoye Zabelino is a rural locality (a village) in Ilyinskoye Rural Settlement, Kolchuginsky District, Vladimir Oblast, Russia. The population was 2 as of 2010.

Geography 
Bolshoye Zabelino is located 11 km northeast of Kolchugino (the district's administrative centre) by road. Lychevo is the nearest rural locality.

References 

Rural localities in Kolchuginsky District